A lurcher is a cross-bred dog resulting from mating a Greyhound or other sighthound with a dog of different type, commonly a herding dog or a terrier. The lurcher was for hundreds of years strongly associated with poaching; in modern times it is kept as a hunting dog or companion dog.

History 
 
Lurcher is an old English term for a cross-bred dog - specifically the result of mating a sighthound with a dog of another type, typically a working breed. The term 'lurcher' was first used with this meaning in 1668; it is considered to be derived from the verb 'lurch', apparently a variant form of 'lurk', and meaning 'lurk' or 'steal'.  

In England from 1389, the right to keep a dog of any kind used in hunting - specifically stated in the Act of Parliament: None shall hunt but they which have sufficient living  in the Anglo-Norman and English of the time: null leverer, ne lerce, nautre chien pur chacer,
translated as, no "Greyhound, Hound nor other Dog to hunt; –  was limited by law to those qualified, which meant anyone who had lands or holdings or income worth more than 10 pounds per annum; in other words: royalty, nobility, the gentry and the wealthy.

This law, though repeatedly modified, remained in force until 1831.

In the nineteenth century, the word was used to describe some rough-haired regional Greyhounds, which were banned from competition by Coursing Clubs such as Swaffham and Newmarket, due to the perception that they cut "turns" to kill instead of working the hare to gain points.

Description 

A lurcher is a cross, generally between a sighthound and a working dog breed. Generally, the aim of the cross is to produce a sighthound with more intelligence, a canny animal suitable for poaching rabbits, hares and game birds. Over time, poachers and hunters discovered that the crossing of certain breeds with sighthounds produced a dog better suited to this purpose, given the lurcher's combination of speed and intelligence.

Use 

Lurchers were traditionally bred in England to assist poachers in hunting rabbits and hares. Around the world they are kept as sporting dogs and family pets, or to compete in sports such as lure coursing and dog racing. In the USA they may compete in lure coursing events through the AKC and the UKC. Cross-breeds are not recognized by any major kennel club. In Canada, where the Canadian Kennel Club prohibits crossbreeding, and in the USA they can be registered with the North American Lurcher and Longdog Association.

References

Further reading 
 Arthur W. Coaten (1909). British Hunting: A Complete History of the National Sport of Great Britain and Ireland from Earliest Records. London: Sampson Low, Marston & Co
 E. P. Thompson (1975). Whigs and Hunters: The Origin of the Black Act London: Allen Lane
 P. B. Munsche (1981). Gentlemen and Poachers: The English Game Laws, 1671–1831. Cambridge: Cambridge University Press
 Harriet Ritvo (1987).The Animal Estate: The English and Other Creatures in the Victorian Age. Cambridge, Massachusetts: Harvard University Press
 David Cannadine (1990). The Decline and Fall of the British Aristocracy New Haven: Yale University Press
 Roger B. Manning (1993). Hunters and Poachers: A Social and Cultural History of Unlawful Hunting in England, 1485–1640. Oxford; New York: Clarendon Press; Oxford University Press.
 Emma Griffin (2007). Blood Sport: Hunting in Britain since 1066. New Haven; London: Yale University Press
 Barry Lewis (2009). Hunting in Britain: From the Ice Age to the Present. Stroud, Gloucestershire: History Press

Dog types
Sighthounds
Dog crossbreeds